The Battle of Buir Lake (sometimes spelled Battle of Buyur Lake), was fought between the Ming dynasty and the Northern Yuan at Buir Lake in 1388. The Ming army was led by General Lan Yu, who undertook the military campaign against Uskhal Khan (Tianyuan Emperor), the Northern Yuan ruler. The Ming army defeated the Northern Yuan horde at Buir Lake, capturing many of their people.

Background 
In 1387 the Ming campaign against the Uriankhai led to Naghachu and the Northern Yuan's surrender in Manchuria and the expansion of Ming territory into Northeast Asia. The Ming then turned their sights to Buir Lake.

Battle 
In December 1388, the Hongwu Emperor ordered Lan Yu to lead a campaign against the Northern Yuan monarch Uskhal Khan Tögüs Temür at Buir Lake, located on the modern-day border of China and Mongolia. Lan led a Ming army comprising 150,000 soldiers in the campaign.

Lan and his army marched through the Great Wall to Daning and then Qingzhou, where they were informed by spies that Tögüs Temür was encamped near Buir Lake. Subsequently, the Ming army advanced northward across the Gobi Desert, eventually reaching Buir Lake.

They did not see the Northern Yuan horde when they came within 40 li (about 20 km) of Buir Lake, disheartening Lan, but his vanguard commander, General Wang Bi (王弼; Marquis of Dingyuan), reminded him that it would be foolish to return with such a large army without accomplishing something. They eventually found out that the Northern Yuan horde was northeast of Buir Lake, and they approached under cover of darkness and a sandstorm. On 18 May 1388, near Buir Lake, the Ming army launched an attack against the Northern Yuan forces, who were caught off guard. The battle concluded with the Ming capturing many of the Northern Yuan soldiers, but Tögüs Temür escaped.

Aftermath 
The Hongwu Emperor issued a proclamation, praising Lan Yu and comparing him to the famous General Wei Qing of the Han dynasty. Lan was eventually created Duke of Liang (涼國公) with a stipend of 3,000 shi and given the honorific Grand Tutor (太傅) for his military successes. Six of Lan's subordinates were made marquises, while the other officers and soldiers received generous rewards.

Langlois (1998) stated that the Ming captured 100 members of Tögüs Temür's family (including Tianbaonu, his younger son), 3000 princes and their subordinates, 77,000 men and women from the camp, various imperial seals of office, and 150,000 domesticated animals, but that Tögüs Temür and his eldest son Tianbaonu escaped. Dreyer (1982) stated that the Ming captured 3000 notables, 70,000 ordinary Mongols, many domestic animals, the Northern Yuan crown prince and his younger brother, but that Tögüs Temür escaped. Tsai (2001) stated that the Ming captured Tögüs Temür's second son, General Qarajang, hundreds of thousands of Mongol people, and their livestock, but that Tögüs Temür and the crown prince escaped.

In his flight from the Ming army, Tögüs Temür eventually arrived at the Tula River, where he was murdered by the Mongol chieftain Yesüder.

References 

Buir Lake
Buir Lake
Wars involving the Northern Yuan dynasty
Buir Lake
1388 in Asia